Regina (trad. "Queen") is a 1987 Italian drama film co-written and directed by Salvatore Piscicelli.

Plot    
Regina is a beautiful actress of forty in an existential crisis. During a party in the house of his agent Lalla he meets Lorenzo, a young man with whom he establishes a troubled relationship. Their relationship gradually consolidates, but in a sadomasochistic way: the violence and mutual humiliation between the two are continuous. Upon returning to the city after a vacation spent on an island, Regina no longer intends to see Lorenzo and closes herself in the house. But Lalla makes them meet again. In their dramatic encounter, Regina offends Lorenzo and injures her arm with a knife, telling him she would report him. Lorenzo takes the knife in his hand and hits Regina.

Cast 
Ida Di Benedetto: Regina
Fabrizio Bentivoglio: Lorenzo
Giuliana Calandra: Lalla
Mariano Rigillo

See also   
 List of Italian films of 1987

References

External links

1987 films
Italian drama films
Films directed by Salvatore Piscicelli
Italian black-and-white films
1987 drama films
1980s Italian-language films
1980s Italian films